Leonardo Luis Borzani  (born 7 May 1982 in Álvarez, Santa Fe) is an Argentine retired footballer who played as a midfielder.

Career
Borzani made his first team debut in 2003 and went on to establish himself as a regular member of the first team squad. In 2009, he was released by Rosario Central on 20 October 2009 UD Almería have signed the Argentine midfielder.

References

External links
 
 Football-Lineups player profile
 
 

1982 births
Living people
People from Rosario Department
Argentine footballers
Association football midfielders
Argentine Primera División players
Primera Nacional players
La Liga players
Segunda División players
Rosario Central footballers
UD Almería players
UD Las Palmas players
Guillermo Brown footballers
Sportivo Belgrano footballers
Central Córdoba de Rosario footballers
Argentine expatriate footballers
Argentine expatriate sportspeople in Spain
Expatriate footballers in Spain
Sportspeople from Santa Fe Province